Bill Killiby (16 January 1911 – 9 May 1979) was an Australian rugby league footballer who played in the 1930s.

Bill Killiby played three seasons of first grade with St George Dragons between 1933-1935 and retired at the end of the 1940 season in Reserve Grade.

Killiby played lock-forward in the 1933 Grand Final against Newtown.  Killiby's last game was on 30 August 1940 in the Reserve Grade Grand Final in which St. George Dragons won 29–10.

War service

Bill Killiby also served with the Australian Army in New Guinea in World War II. He was discharged due to injury in October 1944.

Death

Bill Killiby died on 9 May 1979.

References

St. George Dragons players
Australian rugby league players
1911 births
1979 deaths
Australian Army personnel of World War II
Rugby league locks
Rugby league players from Sydney
Australian Army soldiers